The following is a list of episodes for the CBC original television series, Edgemont. The series started on January 4, 2000, and concluded its fifth and final season on July 21, 2004.

Series overview

Episodes

Season 1 (2000)

Season 2 (2000)

Season 3 (2001)

Season 4 (2002)

Season 5 (2004)

External links
 
 

Edgemont episodes, List of